The Ligue 1 Young Player of the Year is an official award given by the Union Nationale des Footballeurs Professionels to a player aged 23 years or under at the start of the season whose performances are considered to be the best in Ligue 1. The inaugural award was handed to French midfielder Zinedine Zidane of Bordeaux, following the 1993–94 French Division 1 season. It has been awarded ever since its inception, with the exception of the 2019−20 season, where the competition was abruptly cancelled due to the coronavirus pandemic.

The award has been given to 25 different players over the course of 28 seasons, with only Eden Hazard of Lille and Kylian Mbappé of Monaco and Paris Saint-Germain winning the award on more than one occasion. Of these players, only Mbappé has won the award 3 times. Moroccan defender Younès Belhanda, Italian midfielder Marco Verratti and Belgian forward Eden Hazard are the only players from outside of France who have won the award.

French defender William Saliba is the most recent winner of the award, following his loan with Marseille during the 2021−22 Ligue 1 season.

Winners

Multiple wins

Awards won by club

Awards won by nationality

Awards won by playing position

References 

young
Association football young player of the year awards
Rookie player awards